Paradise Point State Park is a public recreation area on the East Fork Lewis River in Clark County, Washington. The state park is crossed by Interstate 5, which pierces the point in the river the park is named for. The park's  include  of shoreline, swimming beach, campground, and hiking trails.

References

Sources

External links
Paradise Point State Park Washington State Parks and Recreation Commission 
Paradise Point State Park Map Washington State Parks and Recreation Commission

Parks in Clark County, Washington
Portland metropolitan area
State parks of Washington (state)
Protected areas established in 1958